Cora squamiformis is a species of basidiolichen in the family Hygrophoraceae. Found in the high Andes of South America, it was formally described as a new species in 2013 by Karina Wilk, Robert Lücking, and Alba Yánez-Ayabaca. The lichen occurs in Bolivia and Ecuador, where it grows on the ground between bryophytes amongst high-mountain vegetation. The specific epithet squamiformis  refers to the squamulose (scaley) appearance of the thallus. A close relative, Cora pavonia, occurs in the same habitat in Ecuador; it has much larger thalli and a different lobe configuration than C. squamiformis.

References

squamiformis
Lichen species
Lichens described in 2013
Lichens of Bolivia
Lichens of Ecuador
Taxa named by Robert Lücking
Basidiolichens